Fairview Downs is a suburb in eastern Hamilton in New Zealand.

It was developed in stages.

Tramway Road, the western boundary of Fairview, was shown as a proposed tramway on an 1865 map. It seems to have been of double width to accommodate a tramway to Cambridge and to have first been discussed by Kirikiriroa Road Board in 1872, though clearing and gravelling didn't start until 1891 and metalling was continuing in 1925. Hamilton Libraries say it was a crown grant and named c. 1890 – 1900 by civic leaders, surveyors and citizens, because there was a tramway in the vicinity.

Carrs Road was named in 1917 by the Carr family who owned it. Alderson Road was named between 1936 and 1940 by A.J. Thompson, the subdivider, after the Alderson family who originally owned the land.

The area south of Powells Road was developed in 1962 by D.M. McKenzie.

Fairview Street was named in 1967 by Alf Steel, the developer, who wanted a name that made the area sound more attractive. A developer bought the farm to the south in 1967. Fairview, to the north of Powells Road, was turned into housing between 1970 and 1974 by Peerless Homes Ltd., owned by Ernest (Alf) Steel.

Demographics

Fairview Downs had a population of 3,201 at the 2018 New Zealand census, an increase of 219 people (7.3%) since the 2013 census, and an increase of 225 people (7.6%) since the 2006 census. There were 1,026 households, comprising 1,587 males and 1,617 females, giving a sex ratio of 0.98 males per female. The median age was 30.4 years (compared with 37.4 years nationally), with 765 people (23.9%) aged under 15 years, 810 (25.3%) aged 15 to 29, 1,341 (41.9%) aged 30 to 64, and 288 (9.0%) aged 65 or older.

Ethnicities were 61.2% European/Pākehā, 30.6% Māori, 7.2% Pacific peoples, 12.7% Asian, and 4.1% other ethnicities. People may identify with more than one ethnicity.

The percentage of people born overseas was 22.0, compared with 27.1% nationally.

Although some people chose not to answer the census's question about religious affiliation, 47.3% had no religion, 33.5% were Christian, 2.4% had Māori religious beliefs, 2.8% were Hindu, 3.7% were Muslim, 1.3% were Buddhist and 2.3% had other religions.

Of those at least 15 years old, 567 (23.3%) people had a bachelor's or higher degree, and 402 (16.5%) people had no formal qualifications. The median income was $31,700, compared with $31,800 nationally. 318 people (13.1%) earned over $70,000 compared to 17.2% nationally. The employment status of those at least 15 was that 1,275 (52.3%) people were employed full-time, 351 (14.4%) were part-time, and 156 (6.4%) were unemployed.

The 2013 Index of Socioeconomic Deprivation, ranked 1-10 from lowest to most deprived areas, lists Fairview Downs at 8/10 (moderate deprivation).

Fairview Downs census area lost and gained a few small areas on its western fringe in 2018. The population has increased slowly. They are younger than the 37.4 years of the national average, but close to the national median income, with more than double Hamilton's Māori average of 23.7%, as shown below (2013 boundary figures in brackets) -

See also
 List of streets in Hamilton
Suburbs of Hamilton, New Zealand

References

Suburbs of Hamilton, New Zealand